CGS Patuakhali is a Pabna Class riverine patrol crafts of Bangladesh Coast Guard.

History
The ship was built at Dockyard and Engineering Works Limited. She was commissioned to Bangladesh Navy as BNS  Patuakhali on 1 November 1974. Later on, in 1995, after the emergence of Bangladesh Coast Guard, the ships were transferred to them. In 1995, she was commissioned to Bangladesh Coast Guard as CGS Patuakhali.

Design
She has a displacement of 69 tons and a complement of 33 personnel. The ship carries one Bofors 40 mm gun of 60 cal. as armament. This patrol craft can be used for coastal patrolling also besides riverine patrolling.

See also
List of ships of the Bangladesh Coast Guard
List of historic ships of the Bangladesh Navy

References

Decommissioned ships of the Bangladesh Navy
Patrol vessels of the Bangladesh Navy
Ships built at Dockyard and Engineering Works Limited
Ships of the Bangladesh Coast Guard